was a Japanese samurai of the Sengoku period, who ruled the Mōri clan.  He was known for a distinctive green cape he wore over his armor, a gift from a Chinese envoy who had been shipwrecked in Tosa Province in 1509. He was older brother of Mōri Motonari.

Family
Father: Mōri Hiromoto (d. 1506)
Brother: Mōri Motonari (1497–1571)

References

1492 births
1516 deaths
Mōri clan
Daimyo
People from Aki Province
People from Hiroshima Prefecture